David Crichton Brown (26 July 1889 – after 1909) was a Scottish professional footballer who played for Tottenham Hotspur and Greenock Morton.

Football career
Brown began his career at Forthill Athletic. After a trial at Reading, Brown joined Tottenham Hotspur. The centre forward participated in one match in 1910 in his time at White Hart Lane before further trials at Birmingham in 1911 and later Merthyr Town. Brown ended his career at Greenock Morton.

References

1889 births
Scottish footballers
English Football League players
Scottish Football League players
Tottenham Hotspur F.C. players
Greenock Morton F.C. players
Year of death missing
People from Broughty Ferry
Footballers from Dundee
Association football forwards